Monsang Naga may refer to:
 Monsang Naga people, the indigenous tribes of North-East India
 Monsang Naga language, an unclassified Sino-Tibetan language of Northeast India